Pulse: A Stomp Odyssey is a 2002 American short documentary film inspired by the Theatrical Production Stomp. The film begins with the members of "Stomp" pounding out a beat from the windows and fire escapes from several floors of a rundown NYC apartment building (the multiples stories are seen to excellent effect on the giant vertical screen) and proceeds with brief segments, cut together with often clever segues, depicting the various international troupes performing in their own parts of the world. (Hollywood Reporter) Some featured performances include Brazil's Timbalada, South Africa's Bayeza Cultural Dancers and Les Percussions de Guinée.

Stomp was directed by Luke Cresswell and Steve McNicholas.  It was the first film to be produced and distributed by Walden Media. It won the 2004 Giant Screen Theater Association Film Achievement Award for Best Film and for Best Sound in 2003. The Motion Picture Sound Editors also nominated it for best Sound Editing in Special Venue Award in 2003.

References 
 Hollywood Reporter, Nov.14, 2002 http://www.hollywoodreporter.com/hr/search/article_display.jsp?vnu_content_id=1762502

External links

2002 films
2002 short documentary films
Documentary films about music and musicians
Documentary films about dance
Walden Media films
American short documentary films
2000s English-language films
2000s American films